Sabatinca chalcophanes is a moth of the family Micropterigidae. This species is endemic to New Zealand and is found in the North Island apart from Northland and in the South Island apart from in the east, south of Queen Charlotte Sound. The adults of this species are on the wing from November to April and as a result of this long period it has been hypothesised that this species has two broods. The preferred habitat of this species is in damp lowland forest. The larval host species are foliose liverwort species including Hymenophyton flabellatum.

Taxonomy 
This species was described by Edward Meyrick in 1885 using material collected at "Makatoku" (likely a misspelling of Makotuku), in the Hawkes Bay, in March and named Palaeomicra chalcophanes. Meyrick went on to give a fuller description of the species published in 1886. In 1912 Meyrick wrongly synonymised S. chalcophanes with S. incongruella which subsequently caused confusion until the error was rectified in 1979. The male lectotype specimen is held at the Natural History Museum, London.

Description

Meyrick described the adults of this species as follows:

Distribution 
This species is endemic to New Zealand. It is found in the North Island apart from Northland and in the South Island apart from in the east, south of Queen Charlotte Sound.

Behaviour
The adults of this species are on the wing from November to April. It has been hypothesised that this long flight season may imply this species has two broods.

Host species and habitat 

The larvae of this species feeds on Hymenophyton flabellatum as well as likely other foliose liverwort species. The preferred habitat of this species is in damp lowland forest.

References

Micropterigidae
Moths described in 1885
Endemic fauna of New Zealand
Moths of New Zealand
Taxa named by Edward Meyrick
Endemic moths of New Zealand